Nickelsville may refer to one of the following:

Nickelsville, Georgia
Nickelsville, Virginia
Nickelsville was once a nickname for Seattle's tent city, named after the mayor Greg Nickels (2002–2010)